Iglesia de Santa Cecilia (Careñes) is a church in Asturias, Spain.

References

External links 
 Spain By Zoran Pavlovic, Reuel R. Hanks, Charles F. Gritzner
 Some Account of Gothic Architecture in SpainBy George Edmund Street
 Romanesque Churches of Spain: A Traveller's Guide Including the Earlier Churches of AD 600-1000 Giles de la Mare, 2010 - Architecture, Romanesque - 390 pages
  A Hand-Book for Travellers in Spain, and Readers at Home: Describing the ...By Richard Ford
 The Rough Guide to Spain

Churches in Asturias
Bien de Interés Cultural landmarks in Asturias